St Giles’ Church, Ollerton is a Grade II listed parish church in the Church of England in Ollerton.

History

The church dates from around 1790.

Parish status

The church is in a joint parish with 
St Matthew's Church, Boughton
St Paulinus' Church, New Ollerton

References

Church of England church buildings in Nottinghamshire
Grade II listed churches in Nottinghamshire